Alluaivite is a rare mineral of the eudialyte group, with complex formula written as . It is unique among the eudialyte group as the only titanosilicate (other representatives of the group are usually zirconosilicates). The two dual-nature minerals of the group, being both titano- and zirconosilicates, are labyrinthite and dualite. They both contain alluaivite module in their structures. Alluaivite is named after Mt. Alluaiv in Lovozero Tundry massif, Kola Peninsula, Russia, where it is found in ultra-agpaitic, hyperalkaline pegmatites.

Notes on chemistry
Alluaivite contains relatively high amounts of admixing strontium, cerium, potassium, and barium, with lesser amounts of substituting lanthanum and zirconium.

Occurrence and association
Alluaivite was found in ultra-agpaitic (highly alkaline) pegmatites on Mt. Alluaiv, Lovozero massif, Kola Peninsula, Russia - hence its name. Associating minerals are aegirine, arfvedsonite, eudialyte, nepheline, potassic feldspar, and sodalite.

References

Cyclosilicates
Sodium minerals
Calcium minerals
Titanium minerals
Trigonal minerals
Minerals in space group 166